Speak is a compilation album consisting of previously obscure material by British Art rock band No-Man. Originally, recorded between 1988 and 1989, the songs were re-mixed and re-sung in 1999 (during the band's sessions for Returning Jesus). The songs had only been released on compact cassette earlier in the band's history.

Snapper Music's 2005 reissue of Speak adds the bonus track "The Hidden Art of Man Ray" (an untreated improvisation from 1988). The track also appears as a second disc on the limited edition of Tonefloat's vinyl release of Speak.  All tracks (except 4 and 10, which are newer versions recorded in 1999) were cleaned up from original tapes, remixed and new vocal takes recorded.

"Pink Moon" is a Nick Drake cover from his album of the same name.

Track listing

Musicians

Tim Bowness – vocals, words, guitar (11)
Steven Wilson – instruments, backing vocals (8,10)
Stuart Blagden – guitar (13)
Ben Coleman – violin (1,6,10,13)
Richard Felix – cello (6,9), harmonica (5)

References

No-Man albums
1993 compilation albums
1999 compilation albums
Snapper Music compilation albums